Sebastjan Komel (born 18 February 1986) is a retired Slovenian professional football defender.

References

External links
Profile at NZS 

1986 births
Living people
People from Šempeter pri Gorici
Slovenian footballers
Slovenia youth international footballers
Slovenia under-21 international footballers
Association football fullbacks
NK Brda players
NK Bela Krajina players
ND Gorica players
Randers FC players
Royal Antwerp F.C. players
PFC Cherno More Varna players
Slovenian PrvaLiga players
Challenger Pro League players
Danish 1st Division players
First Professional Football League (Bulgaria) players
Slovenian expatriate footballers
Expatriate footballers in Belgium
Expatriate men's footballers in Denmark
Expatriate footballers in Bulgaria
Expatriate footballers in Italy
Slovenian expatriate sportspeople in Belgium
Slovenian expatriate sportspeople in Denmark
Slovenian expatriate sportspeople in Bulgaria
Slovenian expatriate sportspeople in Italy